The Festival Amazonas de Ópera (Amazonas Opera Festival) is an annual festival of opera presented in the Amazon Theatre (Teatro Amazonas) in Manaus, Brazil.  The Amazonas Philharmonic is the official orchestra of the Festival, which is held every year from March until May.  In 2011 the orchestra completed its 15th consecutive year of participation in the festival.

In April 2008, the opera, Ça Ira by Roger Waters (from the musical group, Pink Floyd) was performed by the Amazonas Philharmonic at the opening of the XII Festival Amazonas de Ópera, with Luiz Fernando Malheiro conducting.

See also
List of classical music festivals in South America
List of music festivals in Brazil
List of opera festivals

References
Notes

External links
Amazonas region culture website, in Brazilian

Opera festivals
Music festivals in Brazil
Manaus
Tourist attractions in Amazonas (Brazilian state)
Classical music festivals in Brazil